The Light of My Eyes is a 2010 Egyptian romantic comedy-drama film directed by  Wael Ihsan.

Plot
The Light of My Eyes is about Ahmad (who goes under the stage name Noor) a young music composer (Tamer Hosny) and a blind girl named Sarah (Menna Shalabi) and the great love story between them. Sarah breaks up with Noor after a misunderstanding, and she decides to go to America for surgery in order to regain her eyesight. While Noor has to deal with the death of his brother, he has to deal with the fact that Sarah has left him. As she moves on with her life, she falls in love with her doctor Tarek (Amr Yousef), who decides to marry her in back Egypt. What she doesn't know is that Tarek and Noor are childhood friends, and when Noor meets Tarek in the airport he finds out that his friend's fiancée is his love, Sarah. While Sarah thinks that she sees Tarek's friend Ahmad, she doesn't know the fact that its Noor. Noor ends up facing the heartbreak silently until the events lead up to the discovery of this strange twist of fate!

Release
The film was released in cinemas on May 12. The Light of My Eyes  was placed first on the Arabian box office after a week of its release with 4.000.000 LE It was still on top of the Arabian box office after 2 weeks of release with 8.600.000 LE.

Soundtracks
"Yana Ya Mafish" from album Ikhtart Sah
"L Awel Mara" from album Ikhtart Sah
"Ya Waheshni" from album Ikhtart Sah

References

External links
Noor Eieny @ ElCinema.com
 Noor Eieny @ FilFan.com

2010 films
2010s Arabic-language films
Egyptian romantic comedy-drama films
Films about drugs
Films set in Lebanon
2010 romantic comedy-drama films